Estadio Mauricio Vides is a multi-use stadium in Ilobasco, El Salvador. It is currently used mostly for football matches and is the home stadium of C.D. El Roble. The stadium holds 4,000 spectators.

External links
Stadium information

Mauricio Vides